Roz Nixon is an American playwright and producer of events. 
In 2021 she created Roz live “Keeping Artists On Stage” at the Aloft Hotel in Harlem. These exciting events provide artists with work during the ongoing pandemic. Over the years Ms. Nixon has produced Jazz performances that have featured award-winning  artists such as Sandra Reeves Phillips, Me'lisa Morgan, and Jazz super star Roy Hargrove. She is the founder and executive producer of Roz Nixon Entertainment, which produces music festivals, concerts, and promotional events. A division of her organization books performers for television, commercials and film projects. Known as a "special's" casting agent (parts that may not principal but are not background). Casting agents on the east and west coast refer to Nixon as the go to person for finding the perfect actor for a special part. Nixon has written four plays, primarily featuring song and verse regarding famous jazz musicians. Several of her concerts, shows and festivals have been produced in New York, Las Vegas, Miami and Istanbal.

Career
Nixon is the executive producer and founder of Great Women in Music, a month-long festival featuring women in Jazz, Blues, Gospel and Soul music. The initial Festival in 2001 featured Jazz legend Gloria Lynne, R&B Diva Alyson Williams and the Queen of Gospel Shirley Caesar. Her festivals have gone on to present performers such as Phoebe Snow, Macy Gray, Carmen Lundy, Ann Hampton Callaway, Lainie Kazan and Melba Moore.

Roz Nixon Entertainment cast actors and music artists for film, television and commercials. Actors from Roz Nixon Entertainment can be found in such films as Unfaithful, The Devil Wears Prada, American Gangster  Music and Lyrics and in episodes of Sex In the city, NYPD Blue and The Good Wife.  Miss Nixon was the casting agent for a list of commercials like Heineken, Verizon and New York Knicks commercials.

As a playwright, Nixon has penned several plays including "Nothin' But The Blues", "Dedicated To Louis Armstrong", The first theatrical performance ever in a major Jazz festival as well as the critically acclaimed  "SS Nirvana": (A Story of Love & Jazz on the High Seas). which was presented at Birdland in New York City. The fantasy jazz musical takes place in "Madame Royale's Supper Club" on a cruise ship that features legendary jazz artists such as Louis Armstrong, Sarah Vaughan, and Billy Eckstine.

Charles Bartlett as Louis Armstrong
Ghanniya Green as Sarah Vaughan
JaRon Eames as Billy Eckstine

2005 – JVC Jazz Festival, "Dedicated To Louis Armstrong," a biographical musical story dedicated to the life of Louis Armstrong using narration, song, and dance that chronicles his life. Performed at the Blue Note.

2000 – Bell Atlantic Jazz Festival – Nixon presented her work “To Louis Armstrong,” which she wrote and produced. As part of the Bell Atlantic Jazz Fest, it was performed in New York City, Washington, D.C., and Philadelphia.
In New York City, it was performed at the Knitting Factory.

Roy Hargrove – trumpet
John Hicks – piano
Bernard Purdie – drums
Christian McBride – bass
Wycliffe Gordon – trombone

Nixon is also the author of a children's book about music titled Singin' Big Mae's Blues.

In 2008, after submitting an entertainment  story to a local New York newspaper (regarding a social event she attended), Nixon was asked by the paper's editor (Kenton Kirby) to write a weekly article for Caribbean Life News covering  New York City night life. Nixon continues to be a contributing writer for the paper. She has also served as a radio and television show host, and a panelist for music conferences and forums. She is noted as music historian of early period female blues musicians.

Plays
 Nothin’ But the Blues (Ghanniyya Green (1997))
 Sisters That Get Everything 1998 (Me'Lisa Morgan)
 Dedicated to Louis Armstrong, Roy Hargrove, Christian McBride, a theatrical musical  (2000)
 SS Nirvana: A Story of Love & Jazz on the High Seas (Ghanniyya Green)

References

External links
SS Nirvana – Charles Bartlett as Louis Armstrong – Hello Dolly!
Roz Nixon Entertainment
Roz Nixon Website
Jazziversaries
Roz Nixon
Roz Nixon - Producer

American columnists
Living people
American women dramatists and playwrights
20th-century American dramatists and playwrights
21st-century American dramatists and playwrights
American theatre managers and producers
African-American businesspeople
21st-century American businesspeople
20th-century American women writers
21st-century American women writers
American women non-fiction writers
21st-century American non-fiction writers
American women columnists
Year of birth missing (living people)
20th-century African-American women writers
20th-century African-American writers
21st-century African-American women writers
21st-century African-American writers